Łopienno is a village in the administrative district of Gmina Mieleszyn, within Gniezno County, Greater Poland Voivodeship, in west-central Poland.

Łopienno obtained town status in 1519, but it was downgraded in 1888.

References

Villages in Gniezno County